The 2002 European Short Track Speed Skating Championships took place between 11 and 13 January 2002 in Grenoble, France.

Medal summary

Medal table

Men's events

Women's events

Participating nations

See also
Short track speed skating
European Short Track Speed Skating Championships

External links
Detailed results
Results overview

European Short Track Speed Skating Championships
European Short Track Speed Skating Championships
European Championships
International speed skating competitions hosted by France
Sports competitions in Grenoble
European Short Track Speed Skating Championships